Roger Chandler (died 1401 or after) was an English Member of Parliament.

He was a Member (MP) of the Parliament of England for Southwark in February 1383 and September 1388.

References

14th-century births
15th-century deaths
14th-century English people
People from Southwark
Members of the Parliament of England (pre-1707)